The fifth season of New Zealand reality television series The Block NZ, titled The Block NZ: Girls vs Boys, premiered on 29 May 2016. It is set in the Auckland suburbs of Meadowbank. The prize money for achieving the most profit from the auction was raised to $100,000 for this series.

Contestants

Score history

Results

Room reveals

Team Judging

Challenge Scores

Auction

Notes

References

2016 New Zealand television seasons